Greencastle Township may refer to:

Greencastle Township, Putnam County, Indiana
Greencastle Township, Marshall County, Iowa